Navamindradhiraj University (NMU), formerly University of Bangkok Metropolis, is a public university located in Bangkok, Thailand. The university focuses on medical science and public services such as medicine.

History 
During 2000 to 2004, Samak Sundaravej, the Governor of Bangkok, had idea to establish Bangkok Metropolitan Administration's (BMA) own university specialized for urban management. However his idea had not yet been accepted. The idea of establishing BMA's own university was reinstated when Apirak Kosayodhin became the next Governor of Bangkok. At that time, BMA held two higher educational institutions including BMA Medical College and Vajira Hospital and Kuakarun College of Nursing, yet, these two institutions did not have official higher education institute status and thus could not grant their own certificate. Both two colleges' graduates were granted degrees by Mahidol University as Mahidol affiliated institutes.

The "Bangkok Metropolitan Administration Autonomous University Act B.E. ..." draft was submitted to the cabinet in June 2007. In 2009, the cabinet then passed "University of Bangkok Metropolis Act" draft further to the parliament whose approved the university act draft in February 2010. The University of Bangkok Metropolis (UBM) was officially enacted as the university act was published in the Royal Thai Government Gazette on November 12, 2010, which was effective on the next day.

According to the university act, the University of Bangkok Metropolis is an autonomous university funded by BMA and supervised without direct control by both BMA and Ministry of Education. Two higher institutions under BMA, BMA Medical College and Vajira Hospital and Kuakarun College of Nursing, were transformed to the Faculty of Medicine Vajira Hospital and Kuakarun Faculty of Nursing, respectively. The university missions are to educate, promote academic, research, construct and develop advanced academic and profession, propagate knowledge, provide medical service, promote public health, urban management, local administration, metropolitan development, as well as support religion, arts, culture, environment, and sports.

In 2011, His Majesty King Bhumibol Adulyadej gave the permission to use the university name as Navamindradhiraj University (NMU), meaning the ninth monarch, referring to his majesty himself. The bill to change university name was enacted on June 21, 2013.

In 2013, NMU received the Bangkok Community College from Ministry of Education as Urban Community College of Bangkok, which later renamed to Urban Community Development College, and also received Institute of Metropolitan Development from BMA, providing programs that serve urbanized society needs.

NMU expanded their coverage focusing on programs with the shortage of personnels, the urgent need of the country and also non-redundancy from other universities. NMU, by Faculty of Medicine Vajira Hospital, started bachelor's degree program in paramedicine in 2014 providing emergency personnel in emergency medical services for BMA and also Ministry of Public Health. With the expansion of NMU, the Faculty of Science and Health Technology was later established in 2017 providing the various programs in allied health sciences and also instructing students the foundation year.

Academic Infrastructure

 Faculty of Medicine Vajira Hospital
 Kuakarun Faculty of Nursing
 Faculty of Science and Health Technology
 Urban Community Development College
 Institute of Metropolitan Development

Programs Available

References

External links 
 Navamindradhiraj University's official website in Thai

 
Educational institutions established in 2010
Universities and colleges in Bangkok
2010 establishments in Thailand
Universities established in the 21st century